Quinfamide is a drug that has anti-parasitic properties.

Synthesis 
Quinfamide is one of a relatively small family of antiamoebic compounds containing a dichloroacetamide function.

The synthesis begins by amidation of 6-hydroxytetrahydroquinoline with dichloroacetyl chloride. The sequence is completed by acylation with 2-furoyl chloride.

References 

Antiprotozoal agents
Tetrahydroquinolines
Amides
2-Furyl compounds
Phenol esters